Nguyễn Thị Thành (born 20 November 1986) is a Vietnamese former footballer who played as a midfielder. She has been a member of the Vietnam women's national team.

International career
Nguyễn capped for Vietnam at senior level during the 2010 AFC Women's Asian Cup.

References

1986 births
Living people
Women's association football midfielders
Vietnamese women's footballers
Vietnam women's international footballers
Vietnamese women's futsal players
Footballers at the 2014 Asian Games
Asian Games competitors for Vietnam
21st-century Vietnamese women